David Butler (born 23 March 1945) is an English former professional footballer who made over 350 career league appearances in a professional career which lasted from 1964 to 1976.

Career
Born in Thornaby-on-Tees, played as a full back for Stockton, Workington and Watford.

References

1945 births
Living people
English footballers
Thornaby F.C. players
Workington A.F.C. players
Watford F.C. players
English Football League players
Association football fullbacks